Joe Taylor (born ) is an Irish rugby league footballer.

Background
Joe Taylor was born in Leixlip, County Kildare, Ireland.

Playing career
He currently plays for the Leeds Rhinos in the Super League and the North Dublin Eagles. He has previously played rugby union for Barnhall RFC in Leixlip, County Kildare. He is an Ireland international and has also captained the Ireland students rugby league team.

References  

1991 births
Living people
Expatriate rugby league players in England
Ireland national rugby league team players
Irish expatriate rugby league players
Irish expatriate sportspeople in England
Irish rugby league players
Irish rugby union players
Leeds Rhinos players
North Dublin Eagles players
Rugby articles needing expert attention
Rugby league players from County Kildare